The R354 is a Regional Route in South Africa that connects Matjiesfontein with Calvinia via Sutherland.

Its northern origin is the R27 east of Calvinia, Northern Cape. It heads generally south-east to Sutherland. At Sutherland it meets the R356 and is co-signed heading south-west. The two routes cross the Komsberg Range at the Rooikloof and Verlatekloof passes. After about 50 kilometres, the R354 diverges and heads south-east again, before veering south and entering the Western Cape to reach the N1 at Matjiesfontein.

External links
 Routes Travel Info

References

Regional Routes in the Western Cape
Regional Routes in the Northern Cape